The North of England Trimmers' and Teemers Association was a trade union in the United Kingdom. 
The union was formed in 1871 and merged with the Tyne and Blyth association in 1902. It had 1,500 members in 1908, increasing to 1,913 in 1915.

Trimmers and teemers were employed in loading coal onto ships from staithes. Teemers would open the trapdoors on rail waggons which had been positioned above the ships' hoppers. The trimmers would then distribute the coal evenly around the hopper using shovels.

The Trimmers and Teemers Association merged with the Transport and General Workers' Union in 1922.

See also
 Transport and General Workers' Union
 TGWU amalgamations

References

Defunct trade unions of the United Kingdom
Port workers' trade unions
Trade unions established in 1871
Trade unions disestablished in 1922
Transport and General Workers' Union amalgamations
Trade unions based in Tyne and Wear